Brisbane Grammar School (BGS) is an independent, non-denominational, day and boarding school for boys, located in Spring Hill, an inner suburb of Brisbane, Queensland, Australia. It is the oldest secondary boys school in Brisbane. Some of the Brisbane Grammar School Buildings are listed on the Queensland Heritage Register.

Established in 1868 under the Grammar Schools Act that was passed by the Government of Queensland in 1860, the school has a non-selective enrolment policy and currently caters for approximately 1500 students from Years 5 to 12, including around 100 boarders.

Brisbane Grammar School is affiliated with the Australian Boarding Schools Association (ABSA), the Association of Heads of Independent Schools of Australia (AHISA), Independent Schools Queensland (ISQ), and is a founding member of the Great Public Schools' Association Inc (GPS).

History 

Brisbane Grammar School was founded in 1868 under the Grammar Schools Act, which had been passed by the Queensland Government in 1860. It was the second school established under this act in Queensland, with the first being Ipswich Grammar School.

The original school, designed by Benjamin Backhouse, was on a site in Roma Street in Brisbane City, approximately opposite modern Herschel Street.
HRH Prince Alfred, Duke of Edinburgh (1844–1900), second son of Queen Victoria, laid the foundation stone at the site on 21 February 1868. The school opened in February 1869, with ninety-four students and four masters, under the leadership of headmaster Thomas Harlin. In 1881, the school was moved a few hundred metres away to its current site on Gregory Terrace in Spring Hill to make way for Roma Street railway station to become a junction station.

Following the opening of the boarding house in 1886, science laboratories were constructed in 1912.

On 14 August 1916, the Queensland Governor, Sir Hamilton Goold-Adams unveiled a war memorial with the names of 600 students who had enlisted. In 1921, Brigadier General Lachlan Chisholm Wilson, a former pupil, presented a field gun to the school, an Austrian-made 10.4 cm Feldkanone M. 15, which had been taken from the Ottoman Army by the Australian Light Horse at the Capture of Jenin in 1918.

A new library and assembly hall were constructed in 1969 as a celebration of the school's centenary.

During the mid-1990s, the school commenced work on the off-campus Northgate ovals, which now consist of six fields that are used for cricket, rugby union and soccer fixtures. The Indoor Sports Centre was completed in 2000, and the old gymnasium was later renovated to become the new Centre for Art.

In 2002, the school underwent a major redevelopment with the construction of a new middle school, which had its first intake of grade 6 and 7 students in 2003. This middle school consists of a large block of multi-purpose classrooms, functioning as a complete school in itself, with its own teachers and independent timetables. Grade 6 and 7 students spend most of their time in the middle school, although they do use the facilities of the "Upper School" for such activities as physical education and assemblies. In 2014, Year 5 was added to the middle school with 100 new students enrolled.

Headmasters

Extracurricular activities

Cultural activities 
Students are able to participate in a wide range of musical groups, established by former directors of music, John Broughton, and Bruce May, including two orchestras, five concert bands, three stage bands, eight string ensembles, five choirs, and an array of other instrumental ensembles, including three percussion ensembles. John Callaghan was the driving force behind establishing most of the bands. Student-led ensembles feature in concerts every year. Furthermore, each year the BGS Music Department performs an event known as the Grammar Community in Concert, typically at the Queensland Conservatorium of Music. This event brings together members from across the BGS Community, including the BGS Community Choir, incorporating parents, teachers, and friends. The school also has a thriving Drama program, largely established by former Drama Master, Brian Cannon, presenting a range of plays and musicals. In addition, opportunities in debating and public speaking are offered, with the school participating in Queensland Debating Union and Greater Public Schools annual competitions. Additionally, Brisbane Grammar School has recently revamped its participation in enterprise education groups. With the newly reformed Economics and Enterprise Club, students are gaining exciting experiences through external competitions such as YAA, Ecoman and ABW.  An array of other special-interest groups exist, including those which focus on Chess, Astronomy, Aviation, Christianity, Environmental aid, and Community Service.

Sport 
The school offers a range of mainstream sporting activities, including cross country, track and field, rugby, football, basketball, tennis, cricket, gymnastics, swimming, rowing, sailing, chess and volleyball within the GPS association of schools, as well as many others such as water polo, fencing and tae kwon-do.

GPS membership 
Brisbane Grammar School is a member of the Great Public Schools Association of Queensland Inc. (GPS). The school's membership enables its students to participate in sporting competitions as well as engage in endeavours such as Debating and musical events. Most competitions are played out on Saturdays at any of the schools' sporting facilities. The main campus comprises four playing fields in addition to eight tennis courts. Many fixtures, including Cricket, Rugby and Football, are conducted at the Northgate Campus. Sailing is run on Sundays at RQYS, Manly, and the GPS championship is held at the end of the season. The school has had long standing success in Water Polo, winning the competition for 12 of the last 13 years.

Campus

Indoor Sports Centre 
The Indoor Sports Centre was officially opened by the Governor of Queensland, Major General Peter Arnison on 3 March 2000. The centre, which is situated on the main campus, is home to a multi-purpose double Basketball court sports hall (which can also accommodate 3 Volleyball courts, 6 Badminton courts, 12 fencing pistes as well as Futsal), an Aquatic Centre with a 10-lane, 25m heated swimming pool, a Gymnasium featuring a deep foam pit, parallel bars and rings and a spectator area with seating for 150 people during sporting events, an indoor Cricket net, as well as a weights room and theory rooms and amenities. This sports centre has hosted local and international sporting teams, such as the Queensland Reds, Australian Wallabies, Brisbane Broncos, New Zealand All Blacks, Australian cricket team, United States Swimming squad and the English Rugby team.

Northgate playing fields 
Work commenced on the Northgate Playing Fields in the mid-1990s, which now have six ovals, accommodating Cricket, Rugby union, Soccer and Australian Rules Football fixtures. The fields are also used during the school week, especially for winter activities training sessions. Canteen facilities are provided on game days. Adjacent to the main oval is a small stadium which caters for seating for one half of the field, which also contains a dining area. The playing fields were used by the Australian Cricket Team prior to the 2006/2007 Ashes campaign, where they trained with the school's First XI.

BGS Tennis Centre 
The Tennis Centre, adjacent to the school grounds, is the location of tennis courts, a carpark, and a private balcony and small grandstand. Students visit this facility for PE lessons as well as sports training sessions. It is separated from the main campus by a public footbridge, which has been recently closed by Queensland Rail. Access is now available via a long walk from the Indoor Sports Centre, or via the Victoria Park side of the site.

Auditoriums and theatres 
The school has 6 major auditoriums and a theatre: The Centenary Hall, The Great Hall, The Lilley Centre Forum,  The Music Auditorium, The Amphitheatre, The Gallery and The Theatre.

Centenary Hall accommodates the entire senior school (8–12) student body for weekly assemblies, when The Gallery above is opened up to the Hall. The hall is also used for other events such as breakfasts, music concerts, debates and year-level tests. The Gallery above the hall can accommodate 2-year groups for lectures and information sessions.

The Great Hall is one of the school's most historic buildings. The walls have various honour-boards commemorating academic, sporting and cultural achievements, as well as honouring the names of those who have served in wars. The stage is overlooked by a 10*3-metre stained glass window, with Queen Victoria and her knights of the realm as a central feature. The hall provides venue for Form Year Assemblies, Public speaking, debating and music performances. It is also used for dinner parties (such as the Old-Boys Association's reunions or the 'Mothers of Past Student'’ gatherings) and weddings for old-boys.

The Forum can seat around 150–200 people and is used for collaborative learning exercises, usually housing all students in a subject or 3–4 classes. When using the extra seating available, a whole 250 student cohort can be housed.

The Music Auditorium, established during the tenure of Bruce May as director of music, is a venue used to highlight the school's large music program. During the year a varied program of choral, concert and stage band and orchestral concerts take place. Many groups rehearse here weekly. Percussion equipment is able to fit in the hall.

The Drama Theatre, established under the tenure of Brian Cannon as drama master, can seat approximately 300 for theatrical productions.  The school holds a junior school play, a senior school play and a middle school production (play or musical) every year. It is equipped with sound and lighting equipment, including audio and lighting boards operated by students, a green room, and technical storage space. The Centenary Hall for many years was the venue for theatre productions under director, Brian Cannon.

Moogerah Outdoor Education Centre 
Brisbane Grammar School's off-campus centre at Pepperina Hill, near Lake Moogerah, was opened in 1976 and is named the Moogerah Outdoor Education Centre (colloquially referred to as Moogerah). The school sends each form class from grades 8, 9 and 10 out to the campus to strengthen intra-class relationships and morale, as well as develop team-working and leadership skills. Year 11 outdoor education leaders also attend the camp to build the relationship between the senior, and younger students. The five-day programme includes such activities as rock-climbing, bushwalking, orienteering, canoeing, and a camp-out in the bush at the foot of a mountain. Year 5, 6 and 7 students also visit the campsite, but for a shorter duration – one, two and three days respectively.

The centre is also used for various other school activities: Writer's Camps, Composers' Camps, Scientist-In-Residence Camps, sport training, ISCF Christian Camps, Astronomy & sky viewings and fieldwork in senior courses. The rowers utilise the camp's boatshed on the lake's edge for training.

The Lilley Centre 
The most recent construction project of the school is a centre located on the College Road side of the main campus (named after Premier and Chairman of the Board of Trustees Sir Charles Lilley), and houses several classrooms equipped with learning technologies, a library, a lecture theatre (called 'The Forum') and a seniors' study room. The centre was officially opened on 26 February 2010 by former Premier of Queensland, Anna Bligh.

Recent incidents

Pedophile compensation controversy 
In 2003, the school was involved in controversy when it attempted to recover damages from its insurer following students' claims that they had been sexually abused by Kevin Lynch, school counsellor between the 1976 and 1988.

Some 70 former students sued the school, alleging Lynch sexually abused them during counselling sessions. Rejecting out-of-court settlements, some of the victims claimed compensation in the Supreme Court of Queensland. Two former students had allegedly lodged complaints about Lynch's conduct with then headmaster of the school, Maxwell Howell, in the early 1980s and the issue was quietly investigated. However Grammar was unaware the details of the investigation had to be passed on to its insurer. For failing to notify its insurer of the complaints made of Lynch, the school thus became liable for A$1.17 million in legal fees and compensation.

Lynch was charged in January 1997 over the abuses perpetrated at both St Paul's School (where he was subsequently employed) and Brisbane Grammar. Lynch committed suicide on 23 January 1997, the day after being charged.

Fumes exposure incident

On 14 July 2010, 120 students were exposed to a chemical solvent being used in school construction works. Many of these students had been exposed for less than 20 minutes. 6 ambulance crews were dispatched to the school, where 35 students experienced sore eyes and throats as well as minor breathing difficulties. Of the students affected, 2 were hospitalised.

Notable alumni

Politics 
 Don Bennett, aviation pioneer, bomber pilot and member of Member of Parliament in the UK
 Thomas Joseph Byrnes, former Premier of Queensland
 Frederick W. Paterson, a Rhodes Scholar and the only member of a Communist party ever to be elected to a parliament anywhere in Australia.
 Ian Macfarlane, Liberal National Federal Cabinet Minister
 Tom Burns, former Labor Party National President and Deputy Premier of Queensland
 Drew Hutton, co-founder of the Australian Greens, university lecturer, and social and environmental activist 
 Sir James Killen AC KCMG, Minister for Defence and Federal Member for Moreton

Law and the judiciary 
 Justice Ian Callinan, Justice of the High Court of Australia
 Justice Sir Charles Powers, Justice of the High Court of Australia
 Justice John Logan RFD, Judge of the Federal Court of Australia and President of the Defence Force Discipline Appeal Tribunal 
 Max Julius, a noted Barrister and Communist
 Peter Douglas Channell (1947–1993), a notable solicitor involved in the union movement in Queensland during the 1980/90s, president of the QLD Law Society 1988, legal advisor to the commission of inquiry during the Fitzgerald Inquiry, employed Peter Beattie as a solicitor at his firm Peter Channell & Associates
 Sir Arnold Lucas Bennett, a noted barrister and president of the Bar Association of Queensland (1957–1959) 
 Henry George Fryberg was a Justice of the Supreme Court of Queensland

Journalism 
 Malcolm Farr, Canberra-based political journalist and commentator
 Michael Ware, CNN war correspondent and Time magazine journalist

Military and public service 
 Sir Charles Spry, Director-General of the Australian Security Intelligence Organisation
 Major General John Pearn AO RFD, Surgeon General of the Australian Defence Force
 Commander Eric Feldt OBE RAN, Head of the Coastwatchers WWII
 Brigadier General Lachlan Chisholm Wilson, commander of the Australian Light Horse in the First World War.

The arts 
 William Baylebridge, writer and poet
 Robert Davidson, composer, artistic director of Topology
 Robin Dods, architect
 Robert Forster, musician, singer-songwriter and founder of The Go-Betweens
 Jack Lindsay, Marxist author and poet
 J J Hilder, painter
 Leonard Shillam, sculptor 
 David Malouf, internationally acclaimed author  
 Brad Shepherd, member of seminal Australian bands The Fun Things, The Hitmen and The Hoodoo Gurus
 Ian Haug and John Collins of the band Powderfinger
 Murray Shepherd, member of seminal Australian bands The Fun Things, The Screaming Tribesmen and The Four Horsemen.
 Ian Fraser, singer of seminal Brisbane band Dementia 13 and Australian punk band Nunbait
 Spencer Howson, radio presenter
 Stephen Vagg, writer, author of All My Friends Are Leaving Brisbane (2007)
 Adam Zwar, actor and creator of award-winning television shows Wilfred and Lowdown
 Stephen Lance, award-winning director
 Christopher Wrench, organist
 David Logan, author, historian, artistic director of Cabaret Puppet Theatre 
 Philip Edmiston, artistic director, Queensland Marionette Theatre and Theatrestrings 
 Ray Chen, violinist
 Hanbyul (Jason) Jang, member of K-pop boy band Led Apple
 Brett Williams, lead guitarist, backing vocalist with the band Choirboys who had hits such as Run To Paradise, Boys Will Be Boys, Struggletown, Rendezvous, Empire.

Science and academia
 Jock R. Anderson, agricultural economist at the World Bank and emeritus professor at the University of New England
 John Graeme Balsillie, inventor, communications engineer, business proprietor who oversaw establishment of Australia's coastal radio network
 Bob Bryan, geologist and businessman
Wilton Wood Russell Love, prominent Brisbane doctor and one of the foundation members for the Senate of the University of Queensland 1910-1916 
 Alexander Marks, physician and military officer
 Errol Solomon Meyers, prominent Brisbane doctor and one of the founding fathers of the University of Queensland School of Medicine.
Donald Nickin, chemical engineer and professors, Dux of his final year at the school 
Cameron Bell, endocrinologist and Senior Lecturer, Medicine - Northern Clinical School, University of Sydney

Business
Tom Strachan, head of AWX

Sport 

 Dick Marks - Wallaby and national coaching director
 Trent Baker, pitcher and outfielder for the Cleveland Indians and Brisbane Bandits baseball teams
 Mitchell Chapman, New South Wales Waratahs player
 Samuel Conrad, Australian eight Olympic rower
 Ben Cutting, cricket, Queensland Bulls, Australia, Brisbane Heat
 Luke DeVere, professional footballer, former QAS, AIS and current Brisbane Roar and Socceroo centre back
 Ben Dunk, cricket, Queensland Bulls, Hobart Hurricanes, Tasmania Tigers 
 Roy Emerson, tennis player, won 12 Grand Slam singles titles and 16 Grand Slam doubles titles
 Francis Gailey, Australian/American freestyle swimmer
 Julian Gardner, Rugby, Wallaby & Italy
 Matthew Hammelmann- AFL Footballer
 Lee Holdsworth, V8 Supercar driver
 Toby Jenkins, Olympic water polo player 2004
 Dick Johnson, V8 Supercar legend
 Tom Lawton, former Wallabies captain
 Rob Lawton, rugby, Wallaby prop
 Cameron Lillicrap, rugby, Wallaby prop
 Joel Macdonald- AFL Footballer
 Alan Marshal, cricket, Queensland and Surrey County Cricket Club
 Bob McCowan, Wallaby captain 1899
 Andy McIntyre, rugby, Wallaby prop
 Matt McKay, professional footballer, captain of the Brisbane Roar FC and current Socceroo midfielder
 Edgar Moon, tennis player, won 1930 Australian Open men's single title, 1932 men's doubles title, 1929 and 1934 mixed doubles titles
 Stephen Moore, Wallaby since 2005 and former captain
 Frank Nicholson, Wallaby captain 1904
 Otto Nothling, one of only two Australian Cricket/Rugby Union players
 David Ogilvie, Australian test cricketer 1977–78
 Richard Powell, Australian Olympic rower
 Darryn Purcell, Australian rower
 Sir Charles Powers, Queensland Cricket captain
 Matt Renshaw, Cricket, Queensland Bulls, Australia
 Bill Ross, rugby, Wallaby hooker
Pud Thurlow, Australian cricketer
 Keith Winning, rugby, Wallaby captain
 Greg Martin, rugby, Wallaby fullback
 David Nucifora, rugby, Wallaby hooker

Rhodes Scholars

See also 
List of schools in Queensland
List of boarding schools

References

Further reading 
 Primrose, H. (2019). Light Blue Dark Blue, 150 years of Learning and Leadership at Brisbane Grammar School, Brisbane, Brisbane Grammar School, 
 Stephenson, S. (1923). Annals of the Brisbane Grammar School 1869–1922 / compiled by Stuart Stephenson. Brisbane: Government Printer

External links

 

Educational institutions established in 1868
Private secondary schools in Brisbane
Boarding schools in Queensland
Grammar schools in Australia
Boys' schools in Queensland
Nondenominational Christian schools in Brisbane
1868 establishments in Australia
Spring Hill, Queensland
History of Brisbane
Great Public Schools Association of Queensland